This is a list of algebraic coding theory topics.

Algebraic coding theory